The 2014–15 GET-ligaen is the 76th and current season of Norway's premier ice hockey league, Eliteserien (known as GET-ligaen for sponsorship reasons).

The regular season began play on September 11, 2014, and was concluded on March 3, 2015,.

The playoffs to determine the 2014 Norwegian Ice Hockey Champions began on March 6, and ended April 18, 2015.

Participating teams

Team changes
Rosenborg failed to renew its professional license to play in the GET-liga. The vacant spot was given to Manglerud Star.
 Due to the struggling economy, the board of the Tønsberg Vikings asked that the team was to be moved down one division. The vacant spot was given to Kongsvinger Knights.

Regular season

Standings
Updated as of April 23, 2015.4
x – clinched playoff spot; y – clinched regular season league title; r – play in relegation series

1 Stavanger were deducted 3 points for using eligible player. Match between Stavanger and Vålerenga February 28, 2015, set to 0-0.
2 Vålerenga were deducted 6 points for using eligible player.  Match between Stavanger and Vålerenga February 28, 2015, set to 0-0.
3 Stjernen were deducted 8 points for using eligible player.
4After the playoffs had ended, Frisk-Asker were deducted 12 points for using eligible player.

Source: pointstreak.com

Statistics

Scoring leaders

List shows the ten best skaters based on the number of points during the regular season. If two or more skaters are tied (i.e. same number of points, goals and played games), all of the tied skaters are shown. Updated as of March 6, 2015.

GP = Games played; G = Goals; A = Assists; Pts = Points; +/– = Plus/Minus; PIM = Penalty Minutes

Source: pointstreak.com

Leading goaltenders
The top five goaltenders based on goals against average. Updated as of March 6, 2015.

Source: pointstreak.com

Attendance

Source:pointstreak.com

Playoffs
After the regular season, the top eight teams qualified for the playoffs. In the first and second rounds, the highest remaining seed chose which of the two lowest remaining seeds to be matched against. In each round the higher-seeded team was awarded home ice advantage. Each best-of-seven series followed a 1–1–1–1–1–1–1 format: the higher-seeded team played at home for games 1 and 3 (plus 5 and 7 if necessary), and the lower-seeded team at home for games 2, 4 and 6 (if necessary).

Bracket
Updated as of April 18, 2015.

Source: pointstreak.com

Statistics

Scoring leaders
 
List shows the ten best skaters based on the number of points during the playoffs. If two or more skaters are tied (i.e. same number of points, goals and played games), all of the tied skaters are shown. Updated as of April 18, 2015.
GP = Games played; G = Goals; A = Assists; Pts = Points; +/– = Plus/Minus; PIM = Penalty Minutes

Source: pointstreak.com

Leading goaltenders
The top five goaltenders based on goals against average.

Source: pointstreak.com

Qualification
After the regular season had ended, the two lowest ranked teams in the league and the two highest ranked teams in the 1. divisjon competed for the right to play in the 2015–16 GET-ligaen. Kongsvinger Knights, Manglerud Star, Tønsberg Vikings and Comet Halden took part. The tournament wias organized according to a double round robin format, where each club played the others twice, home and away, for a total of six games. The points system and ranking method used, was the same as in the GET-ligaen. The qualification was played between March 5 and March 22.

Standings
Updated as of March 22, 2015.

q – qualified for next years GET-league; r – will play in next years 1. division

4 Due to use of eligible player by Tønsberg, Manglerud was given the victory of the match March 5, 2015. Result was set to 5-0 to Manglerud.

Source: speaker.no

Awards
All-Star team

The following players were selected to the 2014–15 GET-ligaen All-Star team:
Goaltender: Nicklas Dahlberg (Frisk)
Defenseman: Daniel Sørvik (Vålerenga)
Defenseman: Erik de la Rose (Storhamar)
Center: Christian Larrivée (Storhamar)
Winger: Mathias Trettenes (Stavanger)
Winger: Brian Ihnacak (Vålerenga)

Other
Coach of the year: Alexander Smirnov (Storhamar)
Rookie of the year: Martin Gran (Storhamar)

References

External links
  

2014-15
Nor
GET-ligaen